Martin Lucid Dream is the second extended play by American rapper and producer Denmark Vessey. Composed of eight tracks, it was released on October 9, 2015 via Rappers I Know, and re-released in 2017 with two bonus tracks. Production was handled by Azarias, T-White, Exile and Denmark himself. It features guest appearances from Black Milk, Guilty Simpson, MosEL, Stretch Money, and Tanya Morgan.

Music and lyrics 
Throughout the EP, Denmark Vessey addresses the ups and downs of his absurd life with a keen sense of humor. The tone of Martin Lucid Dream is exemplified by the song "Think Happy Thoughts." It is an introspective look at the challenges of life, united by a positive-thinking mantra Vessey inherited from his mother and late grandmother. The track contains soothing vocal harmonies and guitar strums provided by Exile. It gives way to a comedic church skit and then the disjointed string arrangements of "Keep Your Hoes In Check," where Vessey contemplates both deep and shallow questions.

Release and promotion 
Denmark released a music video for Exile-produced track "Think Happy Thoughts" directed by Jeremy Ian Thomas on July 6, 2016.

Critical reception 
Rolling Stone magazine ranked the extended play at number 34 of their list of the 40 Best Rap Albums of 2015.

Track listing

Personnel 

Aleksander Manfredi – additional producer
Azarias – additional producer
Byron Simpson – featured artist
Curtis Cross – featured artist
Damien Randle – executive producer, additional mixing
Denmark Vessey – main artist, executive producer, producer
Devon Callender – featured artist
Donald Freeman – featured artist
Doug Saltzman – mixing, mastering
Frank William Miller Junior – creative direction, design, executive producer
Mosel – featured artist
Stretch Money – featured artist
Tyler T-White – additional producer
Thebe Kgositsile – producer

References

External links 
 

2015 EPs
Albums produced by Earl Sweatshirt
Albums produced by Exile (producer)